Extensor digitorum muscle of feet may refer to:

 Extensor digitorum brevis muscle
 Extensor digitorum longus muscle